Massini is a surname. Notable people with the surname include:

 Christina Massini (born 2002), German canoeist
 Erich Massini (1889–1915), German footballer
 Santiago Massini (born 1914), Argentine fencer
 Stefano Massini (born 1975)m Italian writer, essayist, and playwright

See also
 Massoni
 Passini